Austrofromia polypora, commonly called many-pored sea star or many-spotted seastar, is a species of marine starfish belonging to the family Ophidiasteridae.

Distribution
It has been found at latitudes of between 23.5 and -29.1 degrees, and longitudes of between 151.93 and 167.99 degrees.

Ecology

References

Ophidiasteridae
Animals described in 1916
Taxa named by Hubert Lyman Clark